Jinsha is a county in northwestern Guizhou province, China, bordering Sichuan to the north across the Chishui River. It is the easternmost county-level division of the prefecture-level city of Bijie.

Climate

References

County-level divisions of Guizhou
Bijie